Legends of Chima is the first soundtrack for the animated fantasy TV series of the same name. The orchestral score was composed by Anthony Lledo and released in 2013 on MovieScore Media.

Track listing
Music composed by Anthony Lledo.

Credits
 Anthony Lledo - Composer, Orchestration, Score Producer, Album Producer
 Oleg Kondratenko - Conductor
 Orchestra - F.A.M.E.'s Macedonian Radio Symphonic Orchestra
 Sara Andon - Flute
 Ted Sugata - Oboe & Cor Anglais
 Amanda Walker - Clarinet & Bass Clarinet
 Elliot Lledo Bager- Clarinet
 Giorgi Hristovski - Sound engineer
 Boban Apostolov - Pro Tools engineer
 Riste Trajkovski - Stage Manager
 John Rodd - Album Mastering
 Laurent Koppitz - Orchestra Contractor
 Mikael Carlsson - Album Producer

Reception

The music for Legends of Chima has received widely critical acclaim and was named one of the best scores for television in 2013 by several reviewers. It was awarded the 2013 Cue Award for Best Score for Television by Tracksounds.com.

References

2013 soundtrack albums
Television soundtracks
Soundtrack
Lego soundtracks